Louis Levey Mansion, also known as the Pilgrim Life Insurance Company Building, is a historic home located at Indianapolis, Indiana.  It was built in 1905, and is a two-story, Italian Renaissance style limestone dwelling consisting of a three bay by four bay main block with a one bay by two bay rear block.  It has a semicircular bay on the rear facade. The front facade features a round arched entrance flanked by pilasters and the roof is ringed by a balustrade. The house was converted for commercial uses in the 1950s.

It was listed on the National Register of Historic Places in 1978.

References

Houses on the National Register of Historic Places in Indiana
Renaissance Revival architecture in Indiana
Houses completed in 1905
Houses in Indianapolis
National Register of Historic Places in Indianapolis
1905 establishments in Indiana